William Lay Thompson was an American ornithologist, naturalist and educator. He was Professor Emeritus of Biological Sciences at Wayne State University, an expert on bird vocalizations, past President of the Michigan Audubon Society, and past Editor of the Jack Pine Warbler.

Early life and education
William Lay Thompson was born on February 16, 1930, in Austin, Texas. He was the son of Dora (Lay) Thompson of Lockhart, Texas and William Henry Thompson of Brownwood, Texas. He attended the Austin public schools. After graduating from Austin High School he went to the University of Texas in Austin where he received his bachelor's degree with a major in zoology and a minor in botany. He continued at the University of Texas in Austin for a master's degree in zoology. This was followed by a Doctorate in zoology at the University of California in Berkeley.

Career
From 1955 to 1957, Thompson served in the United States Army Chemical Corps, stationed in Washington D.C.

In 1959, Thompson was engaged to teach at Wayne State University, in Detroit, Michigan, in the Department of Biology. He taught in the University's Adult Education Program and at the Detroit Zoo. He was elected as a Member of AOU (The American Ornithologists' Union) and AAAS (American Association for the Advancement of Science) in which he was elected a Fellow. He retired from Wayne State in 1993 as Professor Emeritus.

Thompson established Museum of Natural History in Biology Department at Wayne State University circa 1972-1976 was used by area schools in "Tandem Teaching" program.

Thompson was a member of the Detroit Audubon Society, in which he served a term as vice president and also the Michigan Audubon Society, in which he served as president for several years.

Personal life
In 1958 Thompson married Retta Catherine Maninger in Berkeley, California. They had three children.

Death
Thompson died on November 27, 2016, in Livonia, Michigan.

Publications

 Summer Birds of the Canadian "Breaks" in Hutchinson County, Texas. Texas J. Sci. 4(2) :220-229.
 The Ecological Distribution of the Birds of the Black Gap Area, Brewster County, Texas. The Texas Journal of Sci. 5(2) :158-177.
 Summary of the Dissertation for the Degree of Doctor of Philosophy. Agonistic Behavior of the House Finch (Carpodacus mexicanus). University of California Graduate Division, Northern Section.
 Agonistic Behavior in the House Finch. Part I. Annual Cycle and Display Patterns. The Condor, 62(4) :245-271.
 Agonistic Behavior in the House Finch. Part II. Factors in Aggressiveness and Sociality. The Condor, 62(5) :378-402.
 An Early Specimen of the Indigo Bunting from California. The Condor, 66(5) :445.
 A Comparative Study of Bird Behavior. The Jack-Pine Warbler, 43(3) :110-117.
 The Songs of Five Species of Passerina. Behaviour, XXXI(3-4) :261-267.
 Song Development in the Indigo Bunting. Animal Behaviour, 16(4) :462-469.
 Song Recognition by Territorial Male Buntings (Passerina). Animal Behaviour, !7(4) :658-663.
 Territorial Defense and Individual Song Recognition in the Indigo Bunting. The Jack-Pine Warbler, 47(3) :76-83.
 An Analysis of Catbird Song. The Jack-Pine Warbler, 47(4) :115-125.
 Song Variation in a Population of Indigo Buntings. The Auk, 87(1) :58-71.
 Geographic Variation in Song Composition of the Indigo Bunting, Passerina cyanea. Animal Behaviour, 18(1):151-158.
 Singing behavior of the Indigo Bunting (Passerina cyanea) (U. S. A.) Abstracts - XI Congressus Internationalis Ornithologicus. The Hague, 30 August - 5 September. :215-216.
 Calls of the Indigo Bunting, Passerina cyanea. Zeitschrift für Tierpsychologie, 27 :35-46.
 Singing Behavior of the Indigo Bunting, Passerina cyanea, Zeitschrift für Tierpsychologie, 31 :39-59.
 A Behavioral and Morphological Study of Sympatry in the Indigo and Lazuli Buntings of the Great Plains. The Wilson Bulletin, 87(2) :145-179.
 Vocalizations of the Lazuli Bunting. The Condor, 78(2):195-207.
 Song Characteristics of the Yellow Warbler. The Wilson Bulletin, 91(4) :533-550.
 Suggestions for Preparing Audiospectrograms for Publications. Condor, 81 :220-221.
 Local Song Traditions in Indigo Buntings: Cultural Transmissions of Behavior Patterns Across Generations. Behaviour, 77(4): 199–221.
 A Burrowing Owl Specimen from the Lower Peninsula of Michigan. The Jack-Pine Warbler, 60(3): 118.
 Infant Transfer Patterns in a Captive Group of Ring Tailed Lemurs (Lemur catta) at the Detroit Zoological Park. American Association of Zoological Parks and Aquariums: Regional Conference Proceedings, :pp. 254–259.
 Study Guide for Comparative Vertebrate Anatomy. Kendall/Hunt Publishing Company; Dubuque Iowa, 91 pages.

Notes

1930 births
American ornithologists
American zoologists
American naturalists
American ecologists
American conservationists
American science writers
American ornithological writers
American male non-fiction writers
American non-fiction environmental writers
University of Texas at Austin alumni
University of California, Berkeley alumni
Wayne State University faculty
2016 deaths